Nikelshchik is a bandy club in Verkhny Ufaley, Russia. The club is playing in the Russian Bandy Supreme League, the second tier of Russian bandy. The home games are played at Stadium Nikelshchik in Verkhny Ufaley. The club colours are blue and white.

Their spectator numbers stand out. Whereas it's unusual in their division to reach 1 000, they usually have a couple of thousand, for example 2 750 against Dynamo Mayak or 3 500 against SKA-Sverdlovsk. Although located in Chelyabinsk Oblast, the club belongs to the bandy federation of Sverdlovsk Oblast.

The club was founded in 1935.

External links
Club page at vk.com
Team image

References

Bandy clubs in Russia
Bandy clubs in the Soviet Union
Sport in Chelyabinsk Oblast
Bandy clubs established in 1935
1935 establishments in Russia